Phrynonax is a genus of snakes in the family Colubridae. The genus is endemic to the New World

Geographic range
Species in the genus Phrynonax are found in South America, Central America, and Mexico.

Species
Three species are recognized as being valid.

Phrynonax poecilonotus 
Phrynonax polylepis 
Phrynonax shropshirei Barbour & Amaral, 1924

Nota bene: A binomial authority in parentheses indicates that the species was originally described in a genus other than Phrynonax.

Etymology
The specific name, shropshirei, is in honor of James B. Shropshire, "Chief Sanitary Inspector, U.S. Army, Canal Zone", who collected the paratype.

References

Further reading
Cope ED (1862). "Catalogues of the REPTILES obtained during the Exploration of the Parana, Paraquay, Vermejo and Uruguay [sic] Rivers, by Capt. Thos. J. Page, U. S. N.; and of those procured by Lieut. N. Michler, U. S. Top. Eng., Commander of the Expedition conducting the Survey of the Atrato River ". Proc. Acad. Nat. Sci. Philadelphia 14: 346-359 + errata and addenda on p. 594. (Phrynonax, new genus, p. 348).

Phrynonax
Snake genera